The  is a line of mecha toys produced by Japanese company Takara (now known as Takara Tomy) and American toy company Hasbro. Initially a line of transforming mecha toys rebranded from Takara's Diaclone and Micro Change toy lines, it spawned the Transformers media franchise.

The premise behind the Transformers toy line is that an individual toy's parts can be shifted about to change it from a vehicle, a device, or an animal, to a robot action figure and back again. The franchise's taglines, "More Than Meets the Eye" and "Robots in Disguise", reflect this ability.

The Transformers toy-line is typically divided into two main factions: the heroic Autobots and their opponents, the evil Decepticons. They are known in Japan as the Cybertrons and Destrons, respectively, although more recent releases often use the English terms.

Many spin-offs are based on the toys including a comic book series, an animated television series, and the feature-length animated The Transformers: The Movie. The original TV series has a number of spin-offs and reboots. A live-action film series was launched in 2007 by director Michael Bay and had 5 movies.

Conception 
The Transformers toy line was created from toy molds mostly produced by Japanese company Takara in the toy lines Diaclone and Micro Change. Other toy molds from other companies such as Bandai were used as well. In 1984, Hasbro bought the distribution rights to the molds and rebranded them as the Transformers for distribution in North America. They approached Marvel Comics to create a backstory with names and short descriptions for each character, which were written by Bob Budiansky.

The designs for the original 28 figures were made by Shōji Kawamori,

Reception
In 1986, film critic Richard Martin called the original toy series a more fun counterpart to Rubik's Cube in "[helping] children develop their hand-eye coordination and their spatial reasoning skills, but Hasbro kept quiet about this, believing no self-respecting 10-year-old boy would bug his parents half to death to buy him an educational toy". He said "[kids mastered] its difficulties in no time [but it makes] grown-ups feel like klutzes". He said the resulting TV show "has topped the ratings every week since its debut in 1985, thus setting the stage for The Transformers: The Movie (1986) [which is] designed to sell more toys to more kids. [...] Transformers don't really die, they just become new products."

Legacy
Ralston produced breakfast cereals based on 1980s cartoons, including Transformers Chocolate Flavored Cereal, similar to Cocoa Puffs.

The official international Transformers convention is BotCon, but other fan events include Auto Assembly and TransForce in the UK and past Transformers only events have included BotCon Japan, BotCon Europe and "OTFCC". The first larger Transformers convention in the Nordic countries is called "The NTFA Mini-Con", with official support from Hasbro Nordic, and was held by members of the NTFA - The Nordic TransFans Association, for the first time on November 3–4, 2007. The second NTFA convention with official support from Hasbro Nordic, now renamed "NordCon" (to avoid copyright problems with the name "Mini-Con") was held in Aalborg, Denmark from 19 June to 20 June 2010. It featured Simon Furman as a guest of honour. In 2011, NordCon and Auto Assembly joined forces to create a new convention called Auto Assembly Europe, which first took place in Uppsala, Sweden, in November 2011.

A Transformers Hall of Fame was created in 2010. The Botcon 2010 inauguration included Bob Budiansky, Peter Cullen, Hideaki Yoke, Ōno Kōjin, and the characters Optimus Prime, Bumblebee, Megatron, Starscream, and Dinobot.

Video games

References

External links

  - Takara-Tomy's Official Transformers Web Site
 Transformers.com - Official Transformers Web Site

 
Action figures
Hasbro brands
Hasbro products
Takara
1980s toys
1990s toys
2000s toys
2010s toys
Transforming toy robots